Dioclea or Diocleia, and also Dioklea or Diokleia may refer to :

 Diocleia (festival), an annual festival in ancient Megara in honor of the hero Diocles, famous for the kissing contest between men
 Dioclea (state), a medieval state of Duklja, in south-eastern part of modern Montenegro
 Dioclea in Praevalitana, an ancient Roman and Byzantine city in the Province of Praevalitana, near modern Podgorica in Montenegro
 Dioclea in Phrygia, an ancient city and former bishopric in Phrygia (Asia Minor)
 Dioclea (plant), a genus of plants in the family Fabaceae

See also
 Doclea (disambiguation)
 Diocletianopolis (disambiguation)